Deruta is a hill town and comune in the Province of Perugia in the Umbria region of central  Italy. Long known as a center of   refined maiolica manufacture, Deruta remains known for its ceramics, which are exported worldwide.

History
Probably built upon Roman foundations, Deruta's name in its early variants (Ruto, Ruta, Rupta, Direpta and Diruta) all signify the “ruin” of this strategic site caused by the 6th-century Gothic War and the Lombard invasion. The Medieval commune that rose from these ruins had its own charter in the 13th century and was governed from its own Palazzo of the Consuls, but in fact Deruta has been under the dominion of neighboring Perugia since the 11th century, and has largely participated in Perugia's vicissitudes. The town's fortifications date from the 12th century, when it was an outpost in Perugia's marches, facing the rival town of Todi. In 1465, under a new agreement with Perugia, the magistrate sent from Perugia would govern with the consent of four local men of good character (quattro boni omini). The ravages of plague were so fierce at Deruta that rewalling in the later 15th century took in a smaller circuit to accommodate the reduced population. Besieged in 1408 during the confusion of the Papal Schism by the condottiere Braccio da Montone, and later heavily damaged by Cesare Borgia, Deruta was plundered by Braccio Baglioni, the master of Perugia. Thus in 1540, when the Papal forces of Pope Paul III ousted the Baglioni family from Perugia in the brief war over salt taxes locally called the "Salt War" (Guerra del Sale), Deruta sided with the papacy against Perugia, an alliance that gained it a reduction in taxes. With the papal reduction of Perugia, the region settled down to uneventful history as part of the Papal States.

Ceramics

The local clay was good for ceramics, whose production began in the Early Middle Ages, but found its artistic peak in the 15th and early 16th century, with highly characteristic local styles of maiolica, such as the "Bella Donna" plates with conventional portraits of beauties, whose names appear on fluttering banderoles with flattering inscriptions. The lack of fuel enforced low firing temperatures, but from the beginning of the 16th century, Deruta became (with Gubbio) a specialist centre for metallic lustreware in golds and ruby red, added over the glaze. In the 16th century Deruta produced the so-called "Rafaellesque" ware, decorated with fine arabesques and grottesche on a fine white ground.

Deruta, with Gubbio and Urbino, continues to produce some of the finest Italian maiolica.

Main sights
San Francesco: Gothic-style church built in 1388 and located in the town center.
Palazzetto Municipale (Town Hall), also called Palazzo dei Consoli: building dates from about 1300, located on the Piazza dei Consoli (the "Square of the Consuls"). In addition to the usual governmental offices, the municipal hall houses a  Museum of Ceramics, an art gallery (Pinacoteca), and a capacious atrium in which one can view a variety of archaeological finds, some of which date to Neolithic times. The municipal Pinacoteca holdings consist of a fresco by Perugino, depicting San Romano and San Rocco (1476), and the collection donated by a local patron, Lione Pascoli, which includes works by Niccolò di Liberatore, called Alunno, Giovan Battista Gaulli, Sebastiano Conca, Francesco Trevisani, Antonio Amorosi, Francesco Graziani and Pieter Van Bloemen.  The gallery also houses works received from various Deruta churches including San Francesco, Sant' Antonio, the Defunti di Ripabianca and the Ospedale San Giacomo.
Sant'Antonio: church with frescoes by Bartolommeo and Giovanni Battista Caporali,  rises at the end of a narrow street, Via Mastro Giorgio.  
Madonna del Divino Amore on Piazza Cavour.
Madonna delle Piagge church along the Tiberina road, at the foot of the old town, yet another church, clad in a colorful array of ceramic tiles.

Deruta was the birthplace of Girolamo Diruta, an organist, music theorist, and composer.

References

External links
Official Comune di Deruta (City of Deruta) website 

Hilltowns in Umbria
Cities and towns in Umbria